Carnage is the debut full-length album by the Chicago-based thrash/sludge metal band Lair of the Minotaur. The album was released in CD form by Southern Lord Records, along with a red vinyl version  with a gold and black screenprinted cover limited to 666 copies.

Track listing
 Carnage Fucking Carnage - 3:32
 The Wolf - 4:54
 Lion Killer - 3:22
 Caravan of Blood Soaked Kentauroi - 5:58
 Enemy of Gods - 3:46
 Warlord - 5:34
 Demon Serpent - 3:53
 Burning Temple - 5:53

Personnel
Adapted from Discogs.

Steven Rathbone - vocals, guitar, synthesizer
Donal James Barraca - bass
Larry Herweg - drums

Production and design
Tom Denney - album artwork
Sanford Parker - engineering, mixing
John Brearley - engineering assistant
Scott Hull - mastering
Erica Barraca - photography

References

2004 debut albums
Lair of the Minotaur albums